Tales of Gooseflesh and Laughter is a collection of science fiction short stories by British writer John Wyndham, published in 1956 by Ballantine Books.

Contents
The collection contains:

 "Chinese Puzzle"
 "Una"
 "The Wheel"
 "Jizzle"
 "Heaven Scent"
 "Compassion Circuit"
 "More Spinned Against"
 "A Present from Brunswick"
 "Confidence Trick"
 "Opposite Numbers"
 "Wild Flower"

"Opposite Numbers", "Wild Flower" and "Compassion Circuit" also appear in The Seeds of Time, the rest of the material is also contained in Jizzle.

1956 short story collections
Short story collections by John Wyndham
Ballantine Books books